The 1998–99 Inter Milan season was the club's 90th in existence and 83rd consecutive season in Serie A, the top flight of Italian football.

Season 
Inter continued its increasingly frustrating run without the league title, which was extended to ten years following a chaotic season. Head coach Luigi Simoni was fired when the side did not perform to the expected level, and the season saw a further three coaches trying to tame Inter without any success. Despite the chaos, the side managed to reach the quarter-finals of the UEFA Champions League, where it lost to eventual champions Manchester United.

Another worry was the injury problems affecting star striker Ronaldo, who only played in 19 of the 34 league matches (although in those 19 games he scored 14 goals). 

After the season, Inter signed Christian Vieri from Lazio for a world-record transfer fee of £32 million to help with goalscoring, while successful ex-Juventus coach Marcello Lippi was appointed in the hope he could end Inter's title drought.

Squad
Squad at end of season

Transfers

Autumn

Winter

Competitions

Serie A

League table

Results by round

Matches

Coppa Italia

Round of 32

Round of 16

Quarter-finals

Semi-finals

UEFA Cup qualification 

Coppa Italia 3rd place: Bologna

UEFA Champions League

Second round

Group phase

Quarter-finals

Statistics

Appearances and goals
As of 30 June 1999

References

Sources
- RSSSF Italy Championship 1998/99

Inter Milan seasons
Internazionale